Long Cold Winter is the second studio album by American glam metal band Cinderella. It was released in July 1988 on Mercury Records.

The record reached No. 10 in the US and became double-platinum for shipping two million copies in the US by the end of the year, just as their debut album Night Songs had done earlier. It was later certified triple platinum.
The album features four singles, which all charted on the Billboard Hot 100. "Don't Know What You Got (Till It's Gone)", the band's highest-charting single, reached No. 12, "The Last Mile" reached No. 36, "Coming Home" reached No. 20, and "Gypsy Road" hit No. 51, more than a year after the release of the album.

Reception

The album received mixed-to-positive reviews. Music critics remarked the shift of the band's musical style from the clichéd glam metal of their debut to more blues-oriented compositions, but they did not agree in the evaluation of the songs' quality. Contemporary reviewers criticized the album for being "too bluesy" and too derivative of other more famous bands' influences. Only Rock Hard reviewer considered Long Cold Winter "a surprisingly strong rock'n'roll album, rough, unpolished, powerful, but still melodious", and praised Keifer's vocals and the level of songwriting.

Modern reviews are similarly polarized. Steve Huey of AllMusic reviewed Long Cold Winter as "a transition album for Cinderella, mixing pop-metal tunes with better hooks than those on Night Songs with a newfound penchant for gritty blues-rock à la the Stones or Aerosmith", and further explained his rating by saying "[not] all of the songs are memorable, but most of them are". Canadian journalist Martin Popoff was harsher in his judgement and wrote that Cinderella strived to be "a next Stones or Aerosmith, not realizing that such talents are both rare and natural, and that without the gift and conviction, [their] attempt reeks of imitation and crass commercialism." Twenty-two years after its release, Geoff Barton re-evaluated the album for the British magazine Classic Rock, praised the band for their change of musical style and called Long Cold Winter "a minor classic." In 2019, Chuck Eddy of Rolling Stone also praised the album and wrote that "in retrospect Long Cold Winter ranks with any blues-rock of the Eighties".

Track listing

Personnel
Cinderella
 Tom Keifer – electric, acoustic and steel guitars, harmonica, vocals, producer
 Jeff LaBar – guitar (lead guitar on "Falling Apart at the Seams" and "Coming Home")
 Eric Brittingham – bass, backing vocals, producer
 Fred Coury – drums (credited but does not play on the album)

Additional musicians
 Jay Levin – steel guitar
 Cozy Powell – drums on all tracks except 5
 Denny Carmassi – drums on track 5
 Rick Criniti – piano, organ, synthesizer
 Kurt Shore, John Webster – keyboards
 Paulinho Da Costa – percussion

Production
Andy Johns – producer, engineer
Thom Cadley – assistant engineer 
Ryan Dorn – overdubs engineer
Steve Thompson, Michael Barbiero – mixing
George Cowan – mixing assistant

Charts

Album

Singles
Gypsy Road

Don't Know What You Got (Till It's Gone)

Coming Home

The Last Mile

Sales and certifications

Accolades

See also
 List of glam metal albums and songs

References

External links
"Long Cold Winter" at discogs

Cinderella (band) albums
1988 albums
Albums produced by Andy Johns
Mercury Records albums
Vertigo Records albums
Blues rock albums by American artists
Southern rock albums